This is a list of all the special editions of the Xbox Wireless Controller, the primary controller of the Xbox One and Xbox Series X and Series S home video game consoles. Besides standard colors, "special" and "limited edition" Xbox Wireless Controllers have also been sold by Microsoft with special color and design schemes, sometimes tying into specific games.

List

Xbox One era

Xbox Series X and Series S era

References

Controller
Game controllers